Lexham is a parish consisting of the twin villages of East Lexham and West Lexham situated in the Breckland District of Norfolk and covers an area of  with a population of 157 at the 2001 census.
 
It is served by St.Nicholas church in West Lexham and St.Andrews in East Lexham in the Benefice of Litcham. Both churches have round towers with St.Andrews reputed to be the oldest in the country.

The Nar Valley Way passes through the villages with a permissive path through the grounds of Lexham Hall estate.

References

Villages in Norfolk
Breckland District
Civil parishes in Norfolk